A type or type A may refer to:
 A-type asteroid, a type of relatively uncommon inner-belt asteroids
 A type blood, a type in the ABO blood group system
 A-type inclusion, a type of cell inclusion
 A-type potassium channel, a type of voltage-gated potassium channel
 A type proanthocyanidin, a specific type of flavonoids
 A-type star, a class of stars
 Type A Dolby Noise Reduction, a type of Dolby noise-reduction system
 Type A climate, a type in the Köppen climate classification
 Type A flu, a type of influenza virus
 Type A evaluation of uncertainty, an uncertainty in measurement that can be inferred, for example, from repeated measurement
 Type A (label), a music label that for example produced the 2004 album What Doesn't Kill You... by Candiria
 Type A personality, a personality type in the Type A and Type B personality theory
 Type A submarine, a class of submarines in the Imperial Japanese Navy which served during the Second World War
 Hemophilia type A, a type of haemophilia
 Renault A-Type engine, a straight-4 automobile engine
 Toyota Type A engine
 Vauxhall A-Type, a car manufactured by Vauxhall Motors from 1908 to 1915
 Type A (artist collective), a pair of New York-based artists named Adam Ames and Andrew Bordwin
 A-type granite a type of granite rock
 Adenosine receptor

See also 
 A Types, the third full-length album released by the melodic hardcore band Hopesfall
 A class (disambiguation)
 Class A (disambiguation)
 Model A (disambiguation)